Gustavo Alejandro Lillo (born August 8, 1973 in Mendoza) is a retired Argentine professional footballer. He played 1 game in the UEFA Intertoto Cup 2002 for FC Krylia Sovetov Samara.

Career

Lillo retired in December 2008 after playing for Guaymallén in the Argentinean Torneo Argentino B, the fourth division.

Honours
 Russian Cup finalist: 2004 (played in the early stages of the 2003/04 tournament for FC Krylia Sovetov Samara).

References

External links
 

1973 births
Living people
Argentine footballers
Russian Premier League players
Godoy Cruz Antonio Tomba footballers
Talleres de Córdoba footballers
PFC Krylia Sovetov Samara players
Club Atlético Los Andes footballers
Association football defenders
Sportspeople from Mendoza, Argentina